The National Stakes is a horse race run at The Curragh racecourse in Ireland.

The title can also refer to the following horse races:

National Stakes (SAJC), a race run at Morphettville Racecourse in Australia
National Stakes (Sandown Park), a race run at Sandown Park Racecourse in England